"The Man Who Saw It" is a 1966 Australian TV play written by Allan Trevor and directed by John Croyston. It was an original for Australian television and aired as part of Wednesday Theatre on the ABC.

Plot
The new candidate for a political party sees a UFO. He is compelled to discuss it, even though this may see him lose his party's nomination.

Cast
Ron Haddrick
Ben Grabiel
John Gray

Production
The play had been performed on radio in 1965.

Reception
The Sydney Morning Herald TV critic said "An Australian play which reaches a competent level of writing, production and acting, is enough of a rarity to encourage a lenient salute to The Man Who Saw It," adding, "there were many well made small points in this well-filled hour about a fledgling political candidate who refuses to be putty in the hands of party schemers."

References

External links
The Man Who Saw It at Ausstage

1966 television plays
1966 Australian television episodes
1960s Australian television plays
Wednesday Theatre (season 2) episodes